The Pielach Formation is a geologic formation in Lower Austria, Austria. It preserves fossils dating back to the Chattian stage (late Kiscellian to early Egerian) of the Oligocene period. The formation unconformably overlies basement rock, and is overlain by the Melk Formation.

Fossil content 
The formation has provided fossils of:
Bivalves

 Acanthocardia bojorum
 Acanthocardia bokorum
 Angulus (Peronidia)
 Anomia ephippium
 Corbula (Caryocorbula) carinata
 Cordiopsis incrassata
 Crassostrea fimbriata
 Diplodonta (Diplodonta) rotundata
 Gari protracta
 Isognomon (Hippochaeta) maxillatus
 Lucinella divaricata
 Lutraria (Lutraria) sanna
 Macrocallista beyrichi
 Mytilopsis basteroti
 Mytilus (Crenomytilus) aquitanicus
 Polymesoda subarata
 Saxolucina heberti
 Scapharca (Scapharca) diluvii
 Thracia ventricosa
 Teredo sp.
 Cardiidae indet.

Gastropods

 Agapilia picta
 Bullia hungarica
 Calyptraea chinensis
 Cochlis tigrina
 Euspira helicina
 Granulolabium plicatum
 Melanopsis impressa
 Mesohalina margaritaceus
 Theodoxus crenulatus
 Turritella (Haustator) venus

See also 
 List of fossiliferous stratigraphic units in Austria

References

Bibliography 
 

Geologic formations of Austria
Oligocene Series of Europe
Paleogene Austria
Chattian Stage
Mudstone formations
Sandstone formations
Lagoonal deposits
Paleontology in Austria